Art Trouble is a 1934 American pre-Code comedy short directed by Ralph Staub and starring Harry Gribbon and Shemp Howard. The film is notable for featuring an uncredited James Stewart in his first screen role.

Gribbon was one of several comedy team partners with whom Shemp Howard worked. Howard had been an original member of the Three Stooges and brother of Stooges Curly Howard and Moe Howard. Shemp began making his own shorts prior to having to return to the Stooges in the wake of Curly's strokes in the mid-1940s.

Cast
Harry Gribbon	 ...	Art Student
Shemp Howard	 ...	Art Student
Beatrice Blinn	 ...	Girl at nightclub
Leni Stengel	 ...	Girl at nightclub
Hope Landin	 ...	Burton's Mother (uncredited)
Marjorie Main	 ...	Woman Who Sits on Painting (uncredited)
James Stewart	 ...	Burton (uncredited)
Don Tomkins	 ...	Burton's Little Brother (uncredited)
Gayne Whitman	 ...	Burton's Father (uncredited)

External links
Art Trouble in the Internet Movie Database

1934 films
1934 comedy films
Vitaphone short films
Warner Bros. short films
1934 short films
American comedy short films
American black-and-white films
1930s American films